Monisha Ghosh is an electrical engineer. She was named a Fellow of the Institute of Electrical and Electronics Engineers (IEEE) in 2015 for her contributions to cognitive radio and signal processing for communication systems.

On December 22, 2019, Ghosh was appointed as the first woman Chief Technology Officer at the US government's Federal Communications Commission.

She holds a Ph.D in Electrical Engineering from the University of Southern California in 1991. She is an alumnus of IIT Kharagpur. She is also a Research Professor at the University of Chicago.

She served as a rotating Program Director at the National Science Foundation from September 2017 to December 2019 in the Computer and Network System Division within the Directorate of Computer and Information Science and Engineering. Previously, she worked at InterDigital, Philips Research and Bell Laboratories.

References 

Fellow Members of the IEEE
Living people
Year of birth missing (living people)
Federal Communications Commission personnel
American electrical engineers